Estabrooks is a surname. Notable people with the surname include:

Bill Estabrooks (born 1947), Canadian educator and politician
Carole A. Estabrooks (born 1954), Canadian applied health services researcher
Frederick L. Estabrooks (1876–?), Canadian politician
George Estabrooks (1895–1973), Canadian-American psychologist
Jonathan Estabrooks (born 1983), Canadian opera singer

See also
Estabrook